Karlsburg (German for "Charles's castle") may refer to:
 
Karlsburg, Mecklenburg-Vorpommern, municipality in Mecklenburg-Vorpommern, Germany
Karlsburg Castle in Durlach in Baden-Württemberg, Germany
a castle in Karlstadt am Main in Bavaria, Germany
a German name of Alba Iulia in Romania

See also
 Carlsberg (disambiguation)
 Carlsburg (disambiguation)
 Karlsberg (disambiguation)
 Karlsborg